Linas and Montlhéry are two communes in the department of Essonne in France. 

Linas-Montlhéry may also refer to: 

 Autodrome de Linas-Montlhéry, a motor racing circuit 
 ESA Linas-Montlhéry, an association football club

See also 

 Linas

Disambiguation pages